The Pamunkey Group is a geologic group in Virginia. It preserves fossils dating back to the Paleogene period.

See also

 List of fossiliferous stratigraphic units in Virginia
 Paleontology in Virginia

References
 

Geologic groups of Virginia